"The Last Time" is a song by American metal band All That Remains. The song was released as a single from their fifth album, For We Are Many, on April 1, 2011, and a music video was released to YouTube on April 1, 2011. In the U.S., it peaked at number eight on the Mainstream Rock chart and at number 25 on the Alternative chart.

Track listing

Charts

References

All That Remains (band) songs
2010 songs
2011 singles
Razor & Tie singles
Songs written by Rob Graves
Songs written by Jason Costa
Songs written by Philip Labonte